The Caproni Ca.37 was a ground attack aircraft designed and built in Italy by Caproni around 1916

Design and development
During 1916 Caproni embarked on the design of a small light ground attack aircraft which followed the design philosophy of its much larger cousins the Ca.3 and Ca.4.

The Ca.37 followed the twin boom layout with central nacelle, which housed the tandem cockpits and the  Lancia Tipo 4 6-cylinder in-line piston engine, driving a 2-bladed pusher propeller. The tail-plane spanned across the two tail-booms and mounted two all-flying rudders for yaw control. Twin main-wheel units were strut mounted under each boom which also carried wooden tail-skids.

The front cockpit was to house a gunner with a flexibly mounted machine-gun. Small bombs were also to be carried for trench attacks and anti-personnel attacks.

Limited further development, in the form of streamlined pod and booms, was carried out as the Ca.38, but no production resulted.

Variants
Ca.37 The sole Ca.37 prototype.
Ca.38A new-build aircraft, or conversion of the sole Ca.37, with streamlined pod and booms for improved performance, but still no production orders.

Specifications (Ca.37)

References

Ca.37
1910s Italian bomber aircraft
Biplanes
Military aircraft of World War I
Twin-boom aircraft
Aircraft first flown in 1916